Lists of Iranian actors are split by gender.

 List of Iranian actresses
 List of Iranian male actors

Iranian